Burgess Hill  Girls (previously named Burgess Hill School for Girls) is an independent, girls-only day  and boarding school for girls aged between 2½ and 18 years (full boarding is offered from 11 years), founded in 1906 by Miss Beatrice Goode. The school is located in Burgess Hill, West Sussex, having moved to its present location in 1928. The school also has boys attending the nursery.

Overview

The multi-building school is situated on Keymer Road, in the West Sussex town of Burgess Hill, and is a five-minute walk from Burgess Hill railway station, which is on the Brighton Main Line. Coaches and minibuses collect girls from outlying areas in Sussex.

The school was last visited in 2014 by the Independent Schools Inspectorate. The main findings were that the school met its aims successfully and the achievement and personal development of all pupils was excellent. The school met all the requirements of the Independent School Standards Regulations (2010) but did not meet all the National Minimum Standards for Boarding Schools (2013). The majority of boarders were found by the report to be from Nigeria and China.

Mrs Kathryn Bell (Head 2014–2017) took the place of Mrs Ann Aughwane (Head 2006–2014) in 2014. In September 2015, she rebranded the school, changing its logo, colours, and name. The name changed from Burgess Hill School for Girls to Burgess Hill Girls.

After 11 years as Deputy Head, Mrs Liz Laybourn became Head in 2017 until she retired in 2022.

In August 2022, Mr Lars Fox became the new Head of Burgess Hill Girls.

Houses

Notable former pupils

Holly Willoughby, television presenter
Caroline Atkins, cricketer
Haydn Gwynne, actor
Funke Abimbola MBE, general counsel for Roche UK
Pamela Frankau, novelist
Greta Scacchi, actor

Heads

 Beatrice Goode (1906–1938)- founder of the school
 Mary Gillies (1938–1955)
 Margaret Morris (1955–1971)
 Doreen Harford (1971–1979)
 Barbara Webb (1979–1992)
 Rosemary Lewis (1992–2001)
 Susan Gorham (2001–2005)
 Ann Aughwane (2006–2014)
 Kathryn Bell (2014–2017)
 Liz Laybourn (2017–2022)
 Lars Fox (2022–present)

References

External links

Official website
ISI Inspection 2014

1906 establishments in England
Boarding schools in West Sussex
Educational institutions established in 1906
Girls' schools in West Sussex
Private schools in West Sussex
Member schools of the Girls' Schools Association
School